The Best of DC is a digest size comics anthology published by DC Comics from September–October 1979 to April 1986. The series ran for 71 issues and while it primarily featured reprints of older comic books, it occasionally published new stories or inventory material.

Publication history
The Best of DC began publication with a September–October 1979 cover date. The digest size format was chosen as a way of gaining distribution in supermarkets and was successful enough that a second such series, DC Special Blue Ribbon Digest, was launched in 1980. The series was 100 pages including covers for 95¢. The "Year's Best Comics Stories" issues included extra pages and a higher price point. 

Two Rudolph the Red-Nosed Reindeer stories intended for publication in the All-New Collectors' Edition treasury series were printed in The Best of DC #4 after the former title was cancelled in the DC Implosion. A Sandman story written and drawn in 1975 was published in The Best of DC #22 (March 1981) after sitting in DC's inventory for several years. 

Writer Michael Fleisher and artist Romeo Tanghal crafted a new story which revealed the origin of the Penguin in The Best of DC #10 (March 1981). Other new material was prepared occasionally for the title including a Teen Titans story in #18 (Nov. 1981) by writer Marv Wolfman and artists Carmine Infantino and Romeo Tanghal and a Legion of Super-Heroes tale in #24 (May 1982) by Paul Levitz, Infantino, and Rodin Rodriguez. Several Sugar and Spike stories by writer-artist Sheldon Mayer which were prepared for overseas markets were published in various issues of The Best of DC The Super Jrs. characters made their only comic book appearance in #58 (March 1985) in a story written by Tom DeFalco and drawn by Vince Squeglia The Best of DC was cancelled as of issue #71 (April 1986).

The issues

Collected editions
 The New Teen Titans Archives Vol. 2  includes the New Teen Titans "Reunion" story from The Best of DC #18, 240 pages, May 2004, 
 The New Teen Titans Omnibus Vol. 1 includes the New Teen Titans "Reunion" story from The Best of DC #18, 684 pages, September 2011, 
 The Jack Kirby Omnibus Vol. 2 includes the Sandman story from The Best of DC #22, 624 pages, May 2013, 
 DC Through the 80s: The Experiments includes The Best of DC: Blue Ribbon Digest #58, 504 pages, May 2021,

See also
 DC Special Series
 Limited Collectors' Edition

References

External links
 
 The Best of DC at Mike's Amazing World of Comics
 Daily Planet Volume 79 Issue #22 (May 21, 1979) house advertisement for The Best of DC at Mike's Amazing World of Comics

Comic book digests
Comics anthologies
Comics by Jack Kirby
Comics by Marv Wolfman
Comics by Michael Fleisher
Comics by Paul Levitz
Defunct American comics
Humor comics
Superhero comics